Nahuel Adolfo Ferraresi Hernández (born 19 November 1998) is a Venezuelan footballer who plays as a defender for São Paulo, on loan from Manchester City.

Club career
Deportivo Táchira announced on 11 August 2017 that Ferraresi would be joining the City Football Group, initially to Uruguayan Segunda División side Torque, with the plan for him to move to fellow CFG club New York City FC subsequently. Ahead of the 2019–20 season, he was loaned out to FC Porto B.

On 15 August 2020 he went to Moreirense on loan.

International career
Ferraresi was called up to the Venezuela under-20 side for the 2017 FIFA U-20 World Cup.

Career statistics

Club

International

Scores and results list Venezuela's goal tally first, score column indicates score after each Ferraresi goal.

Personal life
Ferraresi's father, Adolfo "Pocho" Ferraresi, is an Argentine professional footballer. His mother, Carmen Hernández, is Venezuelan. Ferraresi's sister, Pierina Ferraresi, is a professional swimmer. Born in Venezuela, Ferraresi grew up in his father's hometown of Marcos Paz, Buenos Aires.

Honours

Club
Montevideo City Torque
Segunda División: 2017

International
Venezuela U-20
FIFA U-20 World Cup: Runner-up 2017
South American Youth Football Championship: Third Place 2017

References

External links
 
 

1998 births
Living people
Venezuelan footballers
Venezuelan expatriate footballers
Association football defenders
Nueva Chicago footballers
Deportivo Táchira F.C. players
Montevideo City Torque players
CF Peralada players
FC Porto B players
Moreirense F.C. players
G.D. Estoril Praia players
São Paulo FC players
Venezuelan Primera División players
Uruguayan Primera División players
Segunda División B players
Primeira Liga players
Liga Portugal 2 players
Campeonato Brasileiro Série A players
2021 Copa América players
People from San Cristóbal, Táchira
Venezuelan people of Argentine descent
Venezuelan people of Italian descent
Venezuelan expatriate sportspeople in Argentina
Venezuelan expatriate sportspeople in Uruguay
Venezuelan expatriate sportspeople in Spain
Venezuelan expatriate sportspeople in Portugal
Venezuelan expatriate sportspeople in Brazil
Expatriate footballers in Argentina
Expatriate footballers in Uruguay
Expatriate footballers in Spain
Expatriate footballers in Portugal
Expatriate footballers in Brazil
Venezuela international footballers
Venezuela under-20 international footballers